Gonzalo Díaz (born 14 April 1966) is a Uruguayan footballer. He played in one match for the Uruguay national football team in 1987. He was also part of Uruguay's squad for the 1987 Copa América tournament.

References

External links
 

1966 births
Living people
Uruguayan footballers
Uruguay international footballers
Association football defenders
People from Fray Bentos